Leschenaultia halisidotae is a species of bristle fly in the family Tachinidae. It is found in North America. It is a parasitoid of moths from the genus Halysidota and Lophocampa.

References

Further reading

 
 

Exoristinae
Articles created by Qbugbot
Insects described in 1947
Diptera of North America